Blackpool North and Cleveleys is a constituency represented in the House of Commons of the UK Parliament since 2010 by Paul Maynard, a Conservative.

Constituency profile
The seat covers residential suburbs of the seaside town of Blackpool, and the Thornton-Cleveleys conurbation further north. Residents are slightly less wealthy than the UK average.

History
The seat was created by the Boundary Commission for England following its review of parliamentary representation in Lancashire.

Boundaries

The Borough of Blackpool wards of Anchorsholme, Bispham, Claremont, Greenlands, Ingthorpe, Layton, Norbreck, Park, and Warbreck, and the Borough of Wyre wards of Bourne, Cleveleys Park, Jubilee, and Victoria.

Following the review of parliamentary boundaries, the previous seat of Blackpool North and Fleetwood was abolished. The new seat connects Blackpool's northern half with Cleveleys in Wyre.

The twin Wyre communities of Thornton and Cleveleys are now split between two constituencies. Cleveleys is the closer of the two to the Blackpool border, and encroaches on near neighbour Poulton-le-Fylde, which moves to Wyre and Preston North.

Members of Parliament

Elections

Elections in the 2010s

See also
List of parliamentary constituencies in Lancashire

Notes

References

External links
nomis Constituency Profile for Blackpool North and Cleveleys, presenting data from the ONS annual population survey and other official statistics

Politics of Blackpool
Parliamentary constituencies in North West England
Constituencies of the Parliament of the United Kingdom established in 2010